The 2022 Pakistan Junior League (also known as PJL1) was the only season of the Pakistan Junior League, an under-19 Twenty20 cricket league which is established by the Pakistan Cricket Board (PCB). The tournament took place from 6 to 21 October 2022 and featured six teams playing 19 games in a round robin league format, at Gaddafi Stadium, Lahore. Bahawalpur Royals beat Gwadar Sharks in the final on 21st October and became the inaugural champions of the PJL 2022.

Draft for the league was held on 8 Sep 2022, 24 foreign players from nine different countries were selected by teams along with 66 local players. The opening ceremony and first match of the tournament was held at the Gaddafi Stadium, Lahore on 6 October 2022. The 2022 PJL cost 997 million and incurred losses of 4 million which caused the PJL to be dissolved by the newly appointed PCB management committee.

Venues
All the matches of the inaugural season of PJL took place at Gaddafi Stadium, Lahore, Pakistan.

Marketing
The season's logo variant was unveiled with the hashtag #Next11 and #PJL also being used on social media.

The tournament was broadcast live on PTV Sports and live streamed on Geo Super’s App and Geo Super’s YouTube and Facebook pages in Pakistan. Live streaming was made available on the PCB YouTube/Facebook and PJL YouTube/Facebook channels for the rest of the world.

The tournament broadcast was done through a 22 camera full HD production including enhancements such as Buggy cam and drone camera.

The commentary panel for the inaugural edition included prominent commentators Daren Ganga, Dominic Cork and Mike Haysman. Former Pakistan captain Sana Mir, former Zimbabwe player Tino Mawoyo and seasoned broadcaster Sikander Bakht was also a part of the panel. Roha Nadeem was the presenter.

League stage

Format
The six teams played 5 matches each and got 2 points for every win, none for a loss and 1 point for a no result. The top four teams in the group stage qualified for the play-offs.

Points table

 The top 4 teams qualified for the Playoffs
  Advanced to Qualifier 1
  Advanced to Eliminator

League progression

Fixtures
The PCB confirmed the fixtures for the tournament.

Playoffs

Qualifier 1

Eliminator

Qualifier 2

Final

Team of the tournament

References

External links

 Pakistan Junior League PCB
 Pakistan Junior League ESPNCricinfo

Twenty20 cricket leagues
Cricket leagues in Pakistan
Professional cricket leagues
Professional sports leagues in Pakistan
2022 in Pakistani cricket
2022 establishments in Pakistan
October 2022 events in Pakistan